Distortion is the third studio album by American thrash metal band Forbidden. It was released four years after their second album, Twisted into Form, softening their early thrash style to embrace a wider heavy metal stance, presaging the straight-ahead metal sound of their next album, Green (1997).

Track listing
All tracks written by Forbidden unless otherwise stated.

 At the end of "21st Century Schizoid Man", after 1:30 of silence, a hidden track can be heard, an instrumental called "Annexanax" (2:11).

Personnel 
 Russ Anderson – vocals
 Craig Locicero – lead guitar
 Tim Calvert – rhythm guitar
 Matt Camacho – bass
 Steve Jacobs – drums
 Recorded at Music Annex, Menlo Park, California
 Produced by Patrick Coughlin and Forbidden
 Engineered by Patrick Coughlin

References

1995 albums
Forbidden (band) albums